Balz as a reduced form of the male given name Balthasar is a German-language surname and may refer to:

People
Caroline Balz, Swiss curler
Erwin Bälz (1849–1913), German internist 
Dan Balz (born 1946), American journalist 
Bruno Balz (1902–1988), German songwriter 
Burkhard Balz (born 1969), German politician
Ernst Balz (1904–1943), German sculptor

Other
BALZ, a file compression method in PeaZip

See also
Balz–Schiemann reaction, a chemical reaction